Events in the year 1987 in the Republic of India.

Incumbents
 President of India – Zail Singh until 25 July, R. Venkataraman
 Prime Minister of India – Rajiv Gandhi
 Chief Justice of India – Raghunandan Swarup Pathak

Governors
 Andhra Pradesh – Kumud Ben Joshi 
 Arunachal Pradesh – 
 20 February-18 March: Bhishma Narain Singh 
 starting 18 March: R. D. Pradhan
 Assam – Bhishma Narain Singh
 Bihar – P. Venkatasubbaiah
 Goa – Gopal Singh (starting 30 May)
 Gujarat – Ram Krishna Trivedi 
 Haryana – Saiyid Muzaffar Husain Burney  
 Himachal Pradesh – R. K. S. Ghandhi
 Jammu and Kashmir – Jagmohan Malhotra 
 Karnataka – Ashoknath Banerji (until 26 February), Pendekanti Venkatasubbaiah (starting 26 February)
 Kerala – P. Ramachandran 
 Madhya Pradesh – 
 until 30 November: K.M Chandy 
 30 November-29 December: Narayan Dutta Ojha 
 starting 29 December: K.M Chandy
 Maharashtra – Shankar Dayal Sharma (until 3 September), vacant thereafter (starting 3 September)
 Manipur – K. V. Krishna Rao 
 Meghalaya – Bhishma Narain Singh
 Mizoram – Hiteswar Saikia
 Nagaland – K. V. Krishna Rao 
 Odisha – Bishambhar Nath Pande 
 Punjab – Siddhartha Shankar Ray 
 Rajasthan – Vasantdada Patil (until 15 October), vacant thereafter (starting 15 October)
 Sikkim – T.V. Rajeswar
 Tamil Nadu – Sundar Lal Khurana 
 Tripura – K. V. Krishna Rao 
 Uttar Pradesh – Mohammed Usman Arif 
 West Bengal – Saiyid Nurul Hasan

Events
 National income - 3,618,647 million
 January – Board for Industrial and Financial Reconstruction set up and became operational with effect from May reflecting concerns related to Industrial Sickness and republic day
 March – Magnetic Ink Character Recognition technology introduced for cheque clearing.
 19 March - 1987 Opera House heist
 23 March - Controversial 1987 Jammu and Kashmir Legislative Assembly election held.
 1987 Sino-Indian skirmish the second such conflict between China and India.
 22 May - Hashimpura massacre.
 30 May – The Union territory was split, and Goa was elevated as India's twenty-fifth state, with Daman and Diu remaining Union Territories
 4 June - Operation Poomalai by India in Jaffna.
 June - Minister of External Affairs N. D. Tiwari visits North Korea as part of ministerial conference of Non-Aligned Movement.
 29 July - Indo-Sri Lanka Accord to restore peace in the island signed.
 30 July - Assault on Prime Minister of India Rajiv Gandhi by a Sri Lanka Navy sailor named Vijitha Rohana during Guard of honour at Colombo. 

 October – ICC Cricket World Cup (Reliance Cup 1987)
 11 - 12 October - Jaffna University Helidrop by Indian Peace Keeping Force
 20 November–27 November – The South Asian Games are held in Calcutta. 
 28 December - Indira Gandhi Institute of Development Research was established by RBI as an advanced studies institute to promote research on development issues from a multi-disciplinary point of view.

Law

Births

1 January – Neha Sharma, actress and model.
31 March – Janani Iyer, actress
 18 February – Mahat Raghavendra, actor
24 April – Varun Dhawan, actor
25 April – Mallika Kapoor, actress.
28 April – Samantha Ruth Prabhu, actress.

 30 April – Rohit Sharma, cricketer.
4 May – Charmy Kaur, actress.
7 May – Sundeep Kishan, actor, producer
13 June  G. V. Prakash Kumar, film composer, singer and actor.
25 June – Anil Shetty, entrepreneur, author, activist and motivational speaker
1 August  Taapsee Pannu, actress.
5 August – Genelia D'Souza, actress.
6 August – Aditya Narayan, actor, singer and television host.
25 October – Umesh Yadav, cricketer.
1 November  Ileana D'Cruz, actress.
20 November – Sukirti Kandpal, actress.
18 December – Ram Mohan Naidu Kinjarapu, politician, member of parliament from Srikakulam.
28 December – Diganth Manchale, actor

Deaths
13 March – Hafizur Rahman Wasif Dehlavi, Islamic scholar, jurist and literary critic. (born 1910)
1 June – Khwaja Ahmad Abbas, film director, novelist, screenwriter and journalist (born 1914).
13 October – Kishore Kumar, playback singer, actor, lyricist, composer, producer, director, screenwriter and scriptwriter (born 1929).
27 October – Vijay Merchant, cricketer (born 1911).
24 December – M. G. Ramachandran, Actor, Politician, Former Chief Minister of Tamil Nadu (born 1917).

Full date unknown
Dasaradhi, poet and political activist (born 1925).

See also 
 Bollywood films of 1987

References

 
1980s in India
India
Years of the 20th century in India